Oprosti što je ljubavna pjesma is the tenth studio album by the Sarajevo based pop group Crvena jabuka. This album was officially released in 2005.

With the release of this album, Crvena jabuka's popularity started to go downhill. On 24 April that year the band celebrated their 20th Anniversary at the Skenderija Hall.

On this album, there is a guest appearance by singer and songwriter Arsen Dedić.

Track listing

 Ti mi dusu Uzimas
 Ako me pitas Kamarade
 Esma
 Znam
 11-ta Bozija Zapovjed
 Cetkica za Zube
 Dobro Neka Svira
 Bolujem
 Osjecaj
 Oprosti sto je Ljubavna Pjesma
 Dva i Dva(i Ona Mala Barka)
 Zarjevele Trobente
 Tugo Nesreco (bonus track)

Personnel
Darko Jelcic: drums, percussion
Marko Belosevic: keyboards
Kresmir Krestenac: bass
Dražen Žerić: vocals
Damir Gnoz: guitar
Nikša Bratoš: guitar, violin, mandolin, keyboards, synthesizer, other programming, producer
Arsen Dedić: vocals(4)
Tarik Filipovic: vocals(5)

2005 albums
Crvena jabuka albums